Nusratullo Maksum (1 July 1881 – 1 November 1937) also known as Nusratullo Lutfullayev, was a Tajikstani Soviet politician. He was a recipient of the Order of the Red Banner. From 16 December 1926 to 28 December 1933 he served on the Central Executive Committee of the Soviet Union as the representative of the Tajik Soviet Socialist Republic. He was executed by firing squad during the Great Purge. After the independence of Tajikistan from the Soviet Union, Maksum was featured on the 200 Tajikistani somoni banknote.

References

1881 births
1937 deaths
Recipients of the Order of the Red Banner
People executed by the Soviet Union
Great Purge victims from Tajikistan
Soviet politicians
People executed by firing squad
Tajikistani politicians